Lifford Reservoir in the Kings Norton district of Birmingham, England was built by the Worcester & Birmingham Canal company in 1815 to compensate Lifford Mill for water lost to the canal.  It is located at the junction of the Stratford-upon-Avon Canal and the Worcester and Birmingham Canal and is on the River Rea Cycle Route. Angling is permitted subject to a charge outside the spring close season. Fish in the reservoir include tench, carp, pike, eels, perch, roach and bream.

See also
Edgbaston Reservoir
Wychall Reservoir
River Rea

References

External links

Reservoirs in Birmingham, West Midlands
Canal reservoirs in England
Parks and open spaces in Birmingham, West Midlands